Sir John Dixon Iklé Boyd  (17 January 1936 – 18 October 2019) was a British ambassador and academic administrator. He was British ambassador to Japan from 1992 to 1996, and subsequently the Master of Churchill College, Cambridge from 1996 to 2006.

Early life and education
Boyd was born on 17 January 1936 to James Dixon Boyd and Amélie ( Lowenthal). His father would go on to be became Professor of Anatomy at the University of Cambridge. He was educated at Westminster School, an all-boys public school in central London. He attended Clare College, Cambridge, where he initially read medicine before moving to modern languages. He graduated with a Bachelor of Arts (BA) degree. He was then awarded a postgraduate scholarship to study in the United States, and attended Yale University to undertake foreign area studies and to study Mandarin. He graduated with a Master of Arts (MA) degree in 1962.

Career

Diplomatic career
Boyd was a member of the Her Majesty's Diplomatic Service from 1962 to 1996. He served twice in Hong Kong (on the second occasion as Political Adviser to the Governor) and Beijing twice.  Other postings included Bonn, Washington, and the UK Mission to the UN.  At home he served as Deputy Under-Secretary for Defence and subsequently Chief Clerk of the FCO before his posting to Japan.  His tenure in Tokyo saw a marked expansion in bilateral exchanges on a wide front.  He holds the 
Grand Cordon of the Order of the Rising Sun.

Other roles
Boyd was Master of Churchill College, Cambridge from 1996 to 2006. He was Chairman of the Board of Trustees of the British Museum from 2002 to 2006. 

Boyd served as Chairman of Asia House from 2010 to 2017.

Personal life
In 1968, Boyd married Gunilla Rönngren, a Swedish diplomat. They had two children, before divorcing in the 1970s. In 1977, he married Julia Raynsford. He had three daughters from his second marriage.

Boyd died on 18 October 2019, at the age of 83.

See also 
 Anglo-Japanese relations
 Foreign and Commonwealth Office
 Heads of the United Kingdom Mission in Japan

References

People educated at Westminster School, London
Alumni of Clare College, Cambridge
Fellows of Churchill College, Cambridge
Masters of Churchill College, Cambridge
Knights Commander of the Order of St Michael and St George
Grand Cordons of the Order of the Rising Sun
Ambassadors of the United Kingdom to Japan
Trustees of the British Museum
1936 births
2019 deaths
20th-century British diplomats
Yale University alumni